Miatli is a rural locality (a selo) in Kizilyurtovsky District, Republic of Dagestan, Russia. The population was 4,022 as of 2010. There are 52 streets.

Geography 
Miatli is located 21 km south of Kizilyurt (the district's administrative centre) by road. Novo-Zubutli and Inchkha are the nearest rural localities.

Nationalities 
Avars live there.

References 

Rural localities in Kizilyurtovsky District